Francis Patrick Clune, OBE, (27 November 189311 March 1971) was a best-selling Australian writer, travel writer and popular historian.

Early life and career
Clune was born in Liverpool Street, Darlinghurst, Sydney in 1893, and grew up in Redfern. He left home at 15 and for five years lived the life of an adventurer, claiming to have had twenty-five different jobs by the age of 17, and enlisting with the US Army in Kansas 26 October 1911, deserting and going to sea.

Clune joined the AIF in 1915 during World War I and was soon with the 16th Battalion at Gallipoli. He was wounded in action and repatriated a year after being wounded in both legs.

He married Maud Roy in 1916; they divorced in 1920. He married again in 1923 to artist and sculptor Thelma Cecily Smith (1900–1992), established himself as a tax consultant and by 1930 had settled in Vaucluse. His first book was published in 1933 : Try Anything Once, an account of his adventures. Some of his subsequent books were written in collaboration with P R 'Inky' Stephensen, notably The Viking of Van Diemen's Land and The Pirates of the Brig 'Cyprus'''.

He was fascinated by the 'outsiders' of Australian history such as Captain Melville, Captain Starlight, Martin Cash, Edward Hargraves, Bully Hayes, Jørgen Jørgensen, "Chinese" Morrison, Ben Hall, Ned Kelly, Frederick Bailey Deeming and Louis de Rougemont.

Clune also wrote for many magazines including Walkabout, The Bulletin, Pacific Islands Monthly, Smith's Weekly and ABC Weekly as well as his own Frank Clune’s Adventure Magazine, illustrated by Allan Jordan and published over 8 issues in 1948. He broadcast "Roaming Round Australia" regularly on The ABC from 1945 to 1957.

He was an effective promoter of Albert Namatjira and Australian Aborigines generally.

Clune had his detractors in the literary world. He was criticised for embellishing the facts in the interests of the narrative, and was met with hostility by General Sir Thomas Blamey for his "irregular methods and indiscreet utterances" during WWII. Regardless of criticism, by the early 1950s, his books had sold in excess of 500,000 copies, much to the delight of his publisher Angus & Robertson.

Association with the art world
In the 1940s, Frank and Thelma Clune opened an art gallery in Kings Cross which was subsequently to house works by many of Australia's best known painters, including Sir Russell Drysdale, John Passmore and John Olsen. 

In the 1950s and 1960s, together with his wife Thelma and youngest son Terry, he opened the Terry Clune Art Galleries on the corner of Challis Avenue and Macleay Street, and at 59 Macleay Street in Kings Cross. The gallery became the home for Sydney's young expressionists, such as John Olsen, Stan Rapotec, Robert Klippel and Robert Hughes. The gallery later became the home of the noted artist Martin Sharp and was then known as Yellow House. Frank and Thelma Clune were great friends and supporters of artist William Dobell for many years.

Death
Clune died on 11 March 1971 at St Vincent's Hospital, Sydney at Darlinghurst, age 77. He was buried at South Head Cemetery. He was survived by his wife Thelma and his two sons: Anthony Patrick (1930–2002) and Terry Michael (born 1932).

Recognition and awards

Clune's portrait was painted by Sir William Dargie and by Sir William Dobell for the 1950 Archibald Prize.

He was appointed an Officer of the Order of the British Empire (OBE) in 1967 for services to Australian literature.

Influence
Clune's 1959 book Jimmy Governor - the true story was the inspiration for Thomas Keneally's 1972 novel The Chant of Jimmie Blacksmith.

 Selected publications 
His published books include:Try Anything Once 1933 (Autobiography)Rolling Down the Lachlan 1935Roaming Round the Darling 1936Dig (about Burke and Wills) 1937Free and Easy Land 1938Sky High to Shanghai 1939To the Isles of Spice 1940Chinese Morrison 1940All Aboard for Singapore 1941D'Air Devil 1941Last of the Australian Explorers: the story of Donald Mackay 1942 (about Donald George Mackay)Prowling through Papua 1942Tobruk to Turkey 1943The Red Heart 1944Captain Starlight 1945 (about Captain Starlight)Pacific Parade 1945The Forlorn Hope 1945 (about voyage of boat Forlorn Hope from NT to WA in 1865)The Greatest Liar on Earth 1945Captain Melville 1945Pacific Parade 1945Dark Outlaw (about Frank Gardiner) 1945Try Nothing Twice 1946 (second Autobiography)Golden Goliath 1946Song of India 1946Roaming around Australia 1947Ben Hall the Bushranger 1947 (about Ben Hall)A Noose for Ned 1948High Ho to London 1948Wild Colonial Boys 1948The Demon Killer 1948Sky High to Shanghai 1948Land of My Birth (short stories) 1949Land of Hope and Glory 1949Ashes of Hiroshima 1950All Roads Lead to Rome 1950Hands across the Pacific 1951Somewhere in New Guinea 1951Gunman Gardiner 1951 (new edition of Dark Outlaw)Castles in Spain 1952Flying Dutchmen 1953Land of Australia 1953Roaming round Europe 1954The Viking of Van Diemen's Land (about Jørgen Jørgensen) 1954Roaming round Europe 1954The Kelly Hunters 1954Bound for Botany Bay 1954Korean Diary 1955Martin Cash 1955 (about Martin Cash)Overland Telegraph 1955Roaming round New Zealand 1956Captain Melville 1956Scandals of Sydney Town 1957The Fortune Hunters 1957Flight to Formosa 1958A Tale of Tahiti 1958Murders on Maunga-tapu 1959The Blue Mountains Murderer 1959Jimmy Governor 1959Journey to Canberra 1960Saga of Sydney . Halstead Press, 1961Across the Snowy Mountains 1962The Pirates of the Brig 'Cyprus' 1962Bound for Botany Bay 1964Journey to Kosciusko 1964Search for the Golden Fleece 1965Journey to Pitcairn 1966The Norfolk Island Story 1967. Angus & Robertson Books..King of the Road 1967Serenade to Sydney 1967Scallywags of Sydney Cove 1968The Scottish Martyrs 1969Captain Bully Hayes 1970 (about Bully Hayes)Rascals, Ruffians and Rebels of Early Australia (collection) 1987

See also
 Angus & Robertson
 Ion Idriess
 George Blaikie
 Cyril Pearl

SourcesThe Oxford Companion to Australian Literature'' W H Wilde (2nd edition 1994)

References

1893 births
1971 deaths
Australian travel writers
Australian Officers of the Order of the British Empire
20th-century Australian historians
20th-century Australian journalists